Ibn Baqi or Abu Bakr Yahya Ibn Muhammad Ibn Abd al-Rahman Ibn Baqi (died 1145 or 1150) was an Arab poet from Córdoba or Toledo in al-Andalus.  Baqi is one of the best-known strophic poets and songwriters of Al-Andalus. He moved between  Morocco and Al-Andalus and wrote several poems honoring members of a Moroccan family, the Banu Asara, qadis of Salé. He is especially famous for his muwashshahat.
In the anthology of Al-Maqqari we find a considerable number of his poems.

References

Further reading
Rachid el Hour, "La indumentaria de las mujeres andalusíes a través de Zahrat al-rawd fi taljis taqdir al-fard de Ibn Baq." in: Tejer y vestir de la Antigüedad al Islam. Ed. Manuela Marín (Estudios árabes e islámicos: Monografías, 1). Madrid: Consejo Superior de Investigaciones Científicas, 2001. pp. 95–108.

External links
"The Obituaries of Eminent Men" by Ibn Khallikan (1211–1282), including an example of one of his poems (see nr. 7 Abu Bakr Ibn Baki) (retrieved on 17-2-2008)

12th-century writers from al-Andalus
Poets from al-Andalus
12th-century deaths
Year of birth unknown